Boychick may refer to:
 Boychik, an English word of Yiddish origin
 Boychiks in the Hood, a 1995 memoir by Robert Eisenberg
 Boychick, a film by Glenn Gaylord
 Boychick (novel), a 1971 novel by Leo Skir